Jonathan Hatch Hubbard (May 7, 1768September 20, 1849) was an American lawyer and politician. He served as a U.S. Representative from Vermont.

Biography
Hubbard was born in Tolland in the Connecticut Colony. At the age of eleven Hubbard moved with his parents to Claremont, New Hampshire. He was instructed by a private tutor. Hubbard studied law in Charlestown, New Hampshire and was admitted to the bar in 1790. He commenced practice in Windsor, Vermont. Hubbard married Elizabeth Hastings in 1793 and they had one child, Marie E. Hubbard.

Hubbard was elected as a Federalist to the Eleventh Congress and served from March 4, 1809 to March 3, 1811. He was an unsuccessful candidate for reelection to the Twelfth Congress in 1810. Hubbard served as justice of the Vermont Supreme Court from 1813 to 1815. After serving as justice, Hubbard resumed the practice of law.

Death
Hubbard died on September 20, 1849 in Windsor, Vermont, and is interred at Old South Cemetery in Windsor.

References

External links
 

 govtrack.us
 
 The Political Graveyard

1768 births
1849 deaths
Federalist Party members of the United States House of Representatives from Vermont
People from Tolland, Connecticut